Forensic Heroes II (Traditional Chinese: 法證先鋒II) is a TVB modern suspense series broadcast in May 2008 and it stars Bobby Au-Yeung, Frankie Lam, Kevin Cheng, Charmaine Sheh, Yoyo Mung, Linda Chung, Raymond Cho & Florence Kwok in the second installment of the Forensic Heroes series.

The series is a direct sequel to the 2006's Forensic Heroes (法證先鋒). The main cast features Bobby Au-Yeung, Frankie Lam, and Yoyo Mung from the original series and new cast includes Kevin Cheng and Charmaine Sheh. Linda Chung also reprises her role into this sequel, however due to schedule conflicts with another project, she was written off early in the story.

Synopsis
Bomb disposal expert Yeung Yat-Sing, Ivan, (Kevin Cheng) returns from England to visit relatives and happens to come across a grenade case by accident. Ivan's skills are highly appreciated by Senior Chemist Ko Yin-Bok, Timothy, (Bobby Au-Yeung) and he is invited to join the Forensic Division. Ivan soon becomes the division's rising star. Ivan gets back in touch with his long-lost best friend Koo Chak-Sam, Sam (Frankie Lam). Sam serves as a forensic writer and he is going to get married soon.

During a case, Sam's fiancée Lam Ding-Ding (Linda Chung) and Timothy's police girlfriend Leung Siu-Yau (Yoyo Mung) are caught in an explosion meant to kill two drug dealers. Ding-Ding dies of her injuries, while Siu-Yau loses movement in her right hand and goes half-deaf. Yau's duties are passed to Ma Kwok-Ying, Bell, (Charmaine Sheh) from the Narcotics Bureau. Both Sam and Ivan find Bell extremely charming with her smart and unfathomable characteristics in case handling. Then Ivan fell in love with Bell and the two become a couple.

Integrating laboratory techniques, logical reasoning, and forensic knowledge, the trio strive to fight against crimes tremendously. As they get to know each other more and more, the entangled triangle of love also starts to hinder their working relationships. Cases includes "The Skeleton", "The Case of the Disabled", "The Movie Star Mystery", and many more. The forensic scientists went through different ways to solve each of those cases.

Cast

Main cast

Other cast

Guest starring

Viewership ratings

Accolades
41st TVB Anniversary Awards (2008)
 "Best Drama" Top 5
 "Best Actor in a Leading Role" (Frankie Lam - Sam Koo Chak-Sam) Top 10
 "Best Actress in a Leading Role" (Charmaine Sheh - Bell Ma Kwok-Ying) Top 10

See also
Locard's exchange principle—mentioned several times in different episodes
Forensic Heroes (TV series)

Subsequent series
TVB has announced during its 42nd anniversary that Forensic Heroes III is part of the drama production in 2010.

References

External links
TVB.com Forensic Heroes - Official Website 

TVB dramas
2008 Hong Kong television series debuts
2008 Hong Kong television series endings